The women's hammer throw at the 2012 African Championships in Athletics was held at the Stade Charles de Gaulle on 29 June.

Medalists

Records

Schedule

Results

Final

References

Hammer throw Women
Hammer throw at the African Championships in Athletics
2012 in women's athletics